Michael Livingston is a historian, a professor of medieval literature, and a historical fantasy novelist. His 2015 debut novel, The Shards of Heaven, was followed by two sequels.

Early life, education and career
Originally from Colorado, Livingston has a B.A. in history from Baylor University, an M.A. in medieval studies from Western Michigan University, and both an M.A. and a Ph.D. in English from the University of Rochester. He has been a professor at The Citadel in Charleston, South Carolina since 2006. In his academic life he wrote numerous articles on the world of J.R.R. Tolkien, Beowulf, Chaucer, James Joyce and Robert Jordan.

Television
Michael Livingston is the co-star on the Discovery Channel TV show Contact, in which he skeptically examines potential evidence for the existence of extraterrestrial life and its impact on Earth.

Writing
Livingston has published multiple academic works. He said in 2015, "one of the key bits of advice I ever received as a young novelist-to-be was to try to cut my teeth on writing short stories ... starting with short stories was vital to the development of my career". Livingston's debut novel, The Shards of Heaven, was published by Tor Books in November 2015. Two sequels have subsequently appeared.

Middle English translations

Academia
 
 
 
 
 
Livingston, Michael (2021). Never Greater Slaughter: Brunanburh and the Birth of England. Oxford, UK: Osprey Publishing.
Livingston, Michael (2022). Crécy:  Battle of Five Kings. Osprey Publishing.

General nonfiction

Fiction

Short stories 
 
 
 
 
 Livingston, Michael (2016). "The Temples of the Ark" (Shards of Heaven). Amazon Kindle (short story).

Livingston's 2011 collection Angels Among Other Things, self-published via e-book, consisted of nine short stories, including "The Keeper Alone" and "At the End of Babel".

Novels

Anthologies edited

References

External links
 

21st-century American novelists
American fantasy writers
American historical novelists
The Citadel, The Military College of South Carolina faculty
Living people
Novelists from Colorado
Writers of historical fiction set in antiquity
Year of birth missing (living people)